Complete Surrender is the third studio album by English folk pop duo Slow Club. It was released on July 14, 2014 on independent record label Caroline International. The record was produced by Colin Elliot. The album received "Generally favorable reviews" according to review aggregator Metacritic, and peaked at number 51 on the United Kingdom Albums Chart and 43 on the Top Heatseekers chart.

Track listing

The track "Wanderer Wandering" has a hidden track on the end called "Fucking Feelings".

Reception

Critical response

The album has received mostly positive reviews from critics. On Metacritic, a website which assigns a normalised rating out of 100 from reviews by mainstream critics, it currently holds a rating of 74/100, signifying Generally favorable reviews.

Charts

References

2014 albums
Slow Club albums